Yunesky Sánchez  (born May 3, 1984) is a Cuban professional baseball first baseman who is a free agent.

Sanchez played in the Arizona Diamondbacks farm system from 2007–2010 and the Pittsburgh Pirates system in 2010 and 2011. He played in the Atlantic League of Professional Baseball from 2011–2012 and then signed with the Laredo Lemurs of the American Association of Independent Professional Baseball to finish 2012. In Mexico, he played for the Guerreros de Oaxaca from 2013–2015, the Olmecas de Tabasco in 2016, and the Algodoneros de Unión Laguna in 2018. He also played in the Mexican Pacific League with the Naranjeros de Hermosillo. His wife Lisa was born in New York, but originates from the Dominican Republic. Sanchez has three daughters named Juliette, Kylie, and Victoria.

He played for the Spain national baseball team in the 2013 World Baseball Classic.

References

External links

1984 births
Baseball shortstops
Living people
2013 World Baseball Classic players
South Bend Silver Hawks players
Mobile BayBears players
Reno Aces players
Southern Maryland Blue Crabs players
Altoona Curve players
Somerset Patriots players
Laredo Lemurs players
People from Cárdenas, Cuba
Cuban baseball players
Guerreros de Oaxaca players
Cocodrilos de Matanzas players
Leones del Escogido players
Cuban expatriate baseball players in the Dominican Republic
Tomateros de Culiacán players
Naranjeros de Hermosillo players
Olmecas de Tabasco players
Algodoneros de Unión Laguna players
Cuban expatriate baseball players in Mexico